Lucille may refer to:

People
People with the given name "Lucille":
 Lucille Bailie (born 1969), Australian basketball player
 Lucille Ball (1911–1989), American actress best known for the television series I Love Lucy
 Lucille Berrien (born 1928), American political activist
 Lucille Bliss (born 1916), American actress
 Lucille Charuk (born 1989), Canadian volleyball player
 Lucille Davy, former Commissioner of Education in New Jersey
 Lucy Lawless (born 1968), New Zealand actress
 Lucille Lemay (born 1950), Canadian archer
 Lucille Mulhall (1885–1940), Wild West performer
 Lucille Opitz (born 1977), German speed skater
 Lucille Ricksen (1910–1925), American actress of the silent film era
 Lucille Starr (1938–2020), Canadian singer, songwriter, and yodeler
 Lucille Times (1921–2021), American civil rights activist
 Lucille Wall (1898–1986), American actress who played the role of Lucille March Weeks on the soap opera General Hospital
 Lucille Whipper (1928–2021), American politician

Places
 Lucille, Alabama, an unincorporated community, United States
 Lake Lucille, Alaska, United States
 Lucille Lake (Idaho), United States
 Lake Lucille, near Garibaldi British Columbia, Canada

Arts, entertainment, and media

Music

Instruments
 Lucille (guitar), the name given to many of B.B. King's guitars
 Lucille, a guitar played by Ryusuke, a character in the anime/manga series Beck based on B.B. King's guitar

Albums
 Lucille (album), a 1968 album by blues artist B.B. King
 Lucille, a 2010 album by The Vasco Era

Songs
 "Lucille", title song from the aforementioned B.B. King album.
 "Lucille" (Little Richard song), 1957
 "Lucille" (Kenny Rogers song), 1977
 "Lucille", a 1954 song by Clyde McPhatter with The Drifters

Other uses in arts, entertainment, and media
 Lucille, a barbed wire-wrapped baseball bat wielded as a weapon by Negan in The Walking Dead franchise

See also
 Lucile (disambiguation)
 Lucille's Smokehouse Bar-B-Que
 "My Lucille", a 1985 song by B.B. King
 Lucy (given name)